Andrew Charles Reeves Jefferd (born 13 June 1953) is a former New Zealand rugby union player. Predominantly a second five-eighth, Jefferd represented Canterbury and East Coast at a provincial level, and was a member of the New Zealand national side, the All Blacks, in 1980 and 1981. He played five matches for the All Blacks including three internationals.

References

1953 births
Living people
Rugby union players from Gisborne, New Zealand
People educated at Whanganui Collegiate School
Lincoln University (New Zealand) alumni
New Zealand rugby union players
New Zealand international rugby union players
Canterbury rugby union players
Rugby union centres
East Coast rugby union players